Intsika Yethu Local Municipality is an administrative area in the Chris Hani District of the Eastern Cape in South Africa. The municipality is one of six in this district. Intsika Yethu is an isiXhosa name meaning "our pillars".

Main places
The 2001 census divided the municipality into the following main places:

People
In 2016, the population was 146,341 with an estimated population growth of 0.09% per year. This rural community is 99% Black with Xhosa as the most widely spoken language.

Villages within the district have a sense of community and often work collectively, forming communal networks to address their impoverished circumstances.
Women generally head households and support their families through informal employment. They are primarily responsible for caring for the elderly and younger members of the family, providing food and gathering firewood.

The late political activist and former leader of the South African Communist Party, Chris Hani, was born in Intsika Yethu in the town of Sabalele. He grew up in a home with five siblings, his mother Nomayise and father Gilbert. The province commemorates the late Chris Hani with a statue, a municipality named after him and the annual Chris Hani Freedom Marathon, which is held on the route that Hani walked to school.

Infrastructure
This predominantly rural area is characterised by poverty and unemployment, subsistence farming, food insecurity and diseases like HIV/AIDS. Natural disasters such as drought, erosion, and floods and a lack of adequate emergency plans make pre-existing shortages worse.

Intsika Yethu is part of the greater Chris Hani District Municipality that was reported as one of three HIV/AIDS hotspots in the Eastern Cape. This, while the prevalence of new infections and the syndrome have decreased in other districts in the province.

The area remains underserviced with only 2.4% of the 35 851 households having piped water within their homes in 2016. In 2016, President Jacob Zuma launched the Ncora Bulk Water Project, a government initiative that committed to delivering water to areas in the Chris Hani District Municipality and other areas in the country. This project also aimed to broadened the areas’ economic activities. Its main economic sectors include community services, trade and agriculture.

As part of Eskom’s mission to achieve widespread access to electricity for South Africans by 2020, 94 000 homes were connected over three years in the Eastern Cape. In 2016, 86.6% of the homes in Intsika Yethu had electricity.

Economy
Many of the households rely on social grants as their sole source of income. The working-age population is largely absent in this region with poorly developed infrastructure and limited employment opportunities. Youth often migrate to the cities in search of work in labour-intensive industries like mining.

Politics 

The municipal council consists of forty-two members elected by mixed-member proportional representation. Twenty-one councillors are elected by first-past-the-post voting in twenty-one wards, while the remaining twenty-one are chosen from party lists so that the total number of party representatives is proportional to the number of votes received. In the election of 1 November 2021 the African National Congress (ANC) won a majority of thirty-five seats on the council.

The following table shows the results of the election.

References

External links
 http://www.intsikayethu.gov.za/

Local municipalities of the Chris Hani District Municipality